The 2012–13 IRB Sevens World Series, known for sponsorship reasons as the HSBC Sevens World Series, was the 14th annual series of rugby sevens tournaments for full national sides. The IRB Sevens World Series has been run by the International Rugby Board since 1999–2000.

Itinerary
The schedule for the 2012–13 Series was released to the general public in late June 2012. At the time, the schedule included a new event to be held in La Plata, Argentina. However, on 16 August, the Argentine Rugby Union pulled out of hosting an event in 2012–13, citing demands associated with the country's 2012 entry into The Rugby Championship.

Core teams
Before each season, the IRB announces the "core teams" that received guaranteed berths in each event of that season's series. This was the first series in which 15 teams received this status, up from 12 in the recent past. All 12 core teams from 2011–12 retained their status, with three more being elevated as top finishers in a 12-team qualifying tournament conducted as part of the 2012 Hong Kong Sevens. The 2012–13 core teams are:

Promotion and relegation
For the first time, the IRB instituted a formal promotion and relegation process for core team status in the Sevens World Series, replacing the former ad hoc process. The top 12 core teams in the season table after the next-to-last round of the series in Glasgow retained their status for 2013–14. The remaining three core teams for 2013–14 are being determined in a two-stage qualifying process:
 The first stage was a World Series Pre-Qualifier held as part of the 2013 Hong Kong Sevens. Two qualifiers from each of the IRB's six regions competed. The 12 teams were drawn into three pools, with the top two teams from each pool, plus the top two runners-up, advancing to a quarterfinal round. The winners of the four quarterfinal matches (Russia, Zimbabwe, Tonga, and Georgia) advanced to the second stage.
 The final stage, the World Series Core Team Qualifier, was held as part of the 2013 London Sevens. The pre-qualifiers were joined by Hong Kong, which earned its spot by winning the HSBC Asian Sevens Series, plus the bottom three core teams following the Scotland Sevens. The qualifier was conducted with a pool stage followed by knockout play, with the two finalists and the winner of the third-place match becoming 2013–14 core teams.

Final standings

The points awarded to teams at each event, as well as the overall season totals, are shown in the table below. Points for the event winners are indicated in bold. A zero (0) is recorded in the event column where a team competed in a tournament but did not gain any points. A dash (–) is recorded in the event column if a team did not compete at a tournament.

Source: rugby7.com (archived)

{| class="wikitable" style="font-size:92%;"
|-
!colspan=2| Legend
|-
|No colour
|Core team in 2012–13 and re-qualified for 2013–14
|-
|bgcolor=#ffc|Yellow
|Invited team
|-
|style="border-left:3px solid #7cf;"|Blue bar
|Re-qualified for 2013–14 via the 2013 London Sevens core team qualifier tournament
|-
|style="border-left:3px solid #f46;"|Red bar
|Failed to qualify for 2013–14 via 2013 London Sevens core team qualifier tournament
|}

Player statistics

Points scored

Tries scored

Tournaments

Gold Coast

Dubai

South Africa

Wellington

United States

Hong Kong

Japan

Scotland

London

Dream Team

The 2012–13 HSBC Sevens World Series 'Dream Team' was selected by the series' regular television broadcast commentators.

  Afa Aiono
  Frankie Horne
  Tim Mikkelson
  Joji Ragamate
  Gilles Kaka
  Willy Ambaka
  Dan Norton

References

External links

 
World Rugby Sevens Series